Homersham Cox (1821–1897) was an English lawyer and judge, mathematician and historian.

Life 

He was born at Newington, Surrey, the fourth son of Edward Treslove, and was educated at Tonbridge School. He entered Jesus College, Cambridge in 1839,  graduating B.A. in 1844, and M.A. 1852. He was admitted to the Inner Temple in 1845, and was called to the Bar 1851.

Made a county court judge in Wales, Cox caused a furore by saying that perjury was endemic in Welsh courts. He was shortly moved to Kent, where he made his home at Mark Field House, Tonbridge. Cox died on 10 March 1897, at his home.

Works 

In the late 1840s Cox did theoretical work on the strength and elasticity of materials, following up experimental work of Eaton Hodgkinson.

In The Institutions of the English Government (1863), Cox argued in terms of a constitutional "balance of powers", at variance with the contemporary theorists Walter Bagehot and A. V. Dicey. A History of the Reform Bills of 1866 and 1867 was acknowledged by the author as a partisan Liberal work. It was brought out in time for the 1868 United Kingdom General Election. He was a critic of the cross-party co-operation seen in passing the Reform Bill of 1867, arguing that democracy was being undermined.

Other works were:

The British Commonwealth, Or, A Commentary on the Institutions and Principles of British Government (1854). In it Cox argued that the Norman Conquest led to attempt to break down the local Anglo-Saxon political institutions.
Whig and Tory administrations during the last thirteen years (1868)
Antient Parliamentary Elections: A history showing how parliaments were constituted and representatives of the people elected in antient times (1868)
Is the Church of England Protestant? (1875)

Family 

Cox married Margaret Lucy Smith. They had five daughters and five sons:

 Homersham Cox (1857–1918), mathematician, of Muir Central College. married Amy. Daughrt: Ursula Cox.
 Harold Cox (1860–)
 Margaret Cox (1862–1953), married Sydney Olivier
 Agatha Cox (1864–1958), married Sir William Hamo Thornycroft
 Ethel J Cox (1867–), married Captain Alfred Carpenter (brother of Edward Carpenter)
 Oswald Cox (1868- 12 Dec 1957), solicitor, married Mabel Annie Larkins. Daughters: Theresa, Barbara, Honor 
 Hilda Cox (1871–)
 Theodora Cox (1875–)
 Harold Cox (1859-1936), Liberal MP.
 Cyril Cox (1877-1945), accountant and author

References

Bibliography 

  
  
   
 
 

1821 births
1897 deaths
English barristers
19th-century English mathematicians
19th-century British historians
Members of the Inner Temple
People educated at Tonbridge School
Alumni of Jesus College, Cambridge
19th-century English judges
County Court judges (England and Wales)